

The 2019 Sunderland City Council election took place on 2 May 2019 to elect members of Sunderland City Council in England. The election took place on the same day as other local elections.

Background 
There had been no by-elections to the Council in the period since the 2018 local elections, however two Liberal Democrat councillors who had won by-elections in 2017 and 2018 were seeking re-election, and a Liberal Democrat councillor had stood down ahead of the elections, meaning that there was a two-up election in the Sandhill Ward.

Sitting St Chad's councillor and former mayor Stuart Porthouse was unable to stand for re-election, having been suspended from the Labour Party ahead of the election, after sharing a post online about anti-Semitism. In Washington, a former Labour councillor had resigned having been expelled from the Labour Party after pleading guilty to attempting to sexually communicate with a child.

The Labour Party, Conservatives and UKIP all fielded 25 candidates in the election. The Liberal Democrats fielded 19 candidates, and the Greens 24. In addition, there were 4 Independent candidates, 3 Populist Party candidates, and one each from For Britain and the Democrats and Veterans.

Election results 
The election saw Labour defend 12 seats and lose 10. The Conservatives held the seat they were defending in St Michael's, and gained from Labour in Fulwell, St Peter's, St Chad's and Barnes. The Liberal Democrats defended their seat in Pallion and one seat in Sandhill,they gained a second seat in Sandhill and gained seats in Millfield and Doxford. UKIP won their first ever seats on Sunderland City Council, taking the Ryhope, St Anne's and Redhill wards from Labour. In a close result, the Greens also gained their first seat, taking Washington South from Labour by 3 votes.

Following the elections, Graeme Miller, the Labour leader of the Council, blamed his Party's fortunes on their Brexit stance, warning "We need to think carefully about what Brexit has done here, people have voted against the Labour Party on that."

The election result was the worst for the Labour Party in Sunderland since the Council was set up in 1973, although they had previously lost 9 councillors in the 1982 local elections. It was the Conservatives' best result since 2011, and the best result for the Liberal Democrats since 1982 (when they stood as the SDP/Liberal Alliance).

Council composition
In the last council, the composition of the council was:

After the election, the composition of the council was:

Lib Dem - Liberal Democrats
G - Greens

Ward by ward results 
Asterisk denotes incumbent councillor.

% Change from 2018

Barnes Ward

Castle Ward

Copt Hill Ward

Doxford Ward

Fulwell Ward

Hendon Ward

Hetton Ward

Houghton Ward

Millfield Ward

Pallion Ward 

The Liberal Democrat candidate had won this seat in a by-election in February 2018 following the death of the incumbent Labour councillor. The 2019 result, whilst a hold for the Liberal Democrats, is technically a gain from Labour based on the last time the seat was contested at a local election in 2015.

Redhill Ward

Ryhope Ward

Sandhill Ward 

There was a double vacancy in Sandhill Ward at the 2019 elections. Stephen O'Brien had won the first seat in a by-election in January 2017. The 2019 result, whilst a hold for the Liberal Democrats, was technically a gain from Labour based on the last time the seat was contested at a local election in 2015. The second seat was up for election as the Liberal Democrat candidate who won in 2018 stood down ahead of the 2019 elections. Margaret Crosby defended the seat for the Liberal Democrats.

Shiney Row Ward

Silksworth Ward

Southwick Ward

St Anne's Ward

St Chad's Ward

St Michael's Ward

St Peter's Ward

Washington Central Ward

Washington East Ward

Washington North Ward

Washington South Ward

Washington West Ward

References

Sunderland City Council elections
Sunderland
May 2019 events in the United Kingdom
21st century in Tyne and Wear